Bettie Page Reveals All is a 2013 documentary film about the life history and cultural influence of Bettie Page. Directed by Mark Mori, much of its narration is from audiotape interviews with Page. Individuals offering commentary on Page and her significance include Dita Von Teese, Hugh Hefner, Rebecca Romijn, Tempest Storm, Bunny Yeager, Paula Klaw, Jessicka, Mamie Van Doren and Naomi Campbell.

Premise
The world's greatest pin-up model and cult icon, Bettie Page, recounts the true story of how her free expression overcame government witch-hunts to help launch America's sexual revolution.

Principal cast
 Bettie Page
 Dita Von Teese
 Hugh Hefner
 Tricia Helfer
 Mamie Van Doren
 Rebecca Romijn
 Stacy Burke
 Christina Aguilera
 Naomi Campbell
 Beyonce
 Rihanna
 Madonna
 Lady Gaga
 Katy Perry
 Devin DeVasquez

Reception

Critical response 
Critical response for Bettie Page Reveals All has been mostly positive. , the film holds a 75 percent "fresh" rating on the review aggregator Rotten Tomatoes with 21 positive reviews and 7 negative and an average rating of 6.8/10.

Awards 
Bettie Page Reveals All won the Jury Award for Best Feature Documentary at the 2013 Garden State Film Festival.

References

External links
 
 Official website for the film
 In ‘Reveals All,’ Bettie Page emerges from seclusion to unveil secret past" by Robin Leach in Las Vegas Sun (5 April 2012)
 Bettie Page Reveals All: Film Review by John DeFore in The Hollywood Reporter (20 November 2012)

2012 films
American documentary films
Documentary films about fandom
Documentary films about entertainers
BDSM in films
Documentary films about American pornography
Documentary films about women
2010s English-language films
2010s American films